Karim Rossi (born 1 May 1994) is a Swiss professional footballer who plays as a forward for Indonesian club Dewa United. His uncle Youssef Rossi also played professional football.

Career
Rossi began his career in his native Switzerland with Lausanne-Sport and Grasshopper Club Zürich before joining English club Stoke City in the summer of 2011. Rossi spent three seasons at Stoke playing for the club's under-18 and under-21 sides.

In July 2014, Rossi left Stoke and joined Hull City. Playing and scoring regularly for the Reserve side, Rossi was linked with loan moves to clubs in The Football League.

Zulte Waregem
On 23 January 2015, Rossi signed for Belgian Pro League side Zulte Waregem on a six-month loan from Hull City. He made his professional debut on 1 February 2015 in a 0–0 draw with Anderlecht. On 7 February 2015, he scored his first and second professional goals against Lierse coming on as a half time substitute.

Spezia
On 15 July 2015, Rossi signed for Serie B side Spezia Calcio. On 8 August 2015, he made his home debut in a 1–0 win against Brescia Calcio in the Coppa Italia.

On 26 January 2016, after a lack of game time and frustrations, Rossi left and signed for Swiss Super League, FC Lugano for an undisclosed fee.

Lugano
Rossi made a successful debut against FC Thun on 13 February 2016 despite the 2–1 loss. On 29 May 2016, he made an appearance in the Swiss Cup final which was lost 2–1 against FC Zürich.

On 16 August 2016, Rossi joined FC Schaffhausen on loan from Lugano until the end of the year.

References

External links
 

1994 births
Living people
Swiss men's footballers
Swiss expatriate footballers
Association football forwards
FC Lausanne-Sport players
Grasshopper Club Zürich players
Stoke City F.C. players
Hull City A.F.C. players
S.V. Zulte Waregem players
Spezia Calcio players
FC Lugano players
FC Schaffhausen players
SC Cambuur players
SC Telstar players
FC Chiasso players
AFC Eskilstuna players
FC Tsarsko Selo Sofia players
Racing FC Union Luxembourg players
Dewa United F.C. players
Eerste Divisie players
Belgian Pro League players
Swiss Super League players
Swiss Challenge League players
Serie B players
Superettan players
First Professional Football League (Bulgaria) players
Luxembourg National Division players
Liga 1 (Indonesia) players
Swiss people of Moroccan descent
Swiss expatriate sportspeople in England
Swiss expatriate sportspeople in Belgium
Swiss expatriate sportspeople in Italy
Swiss expatriate sportspeople in the Netherlands
Swiss expatriate sportspeople in Sweden
Swiss expatriate sportspeople in Luxembourg
Expatriate sportspeople in Indonesia
Expatriate footballers in England
Expatriate footballers in Belgium
Expatriate footballers in Italy
Expatriate footballers in the Netherlands
Expatriate footballers in Sweden
Expatriate footballers in Luxembourg
Expatriate footballers in Indonesia

Footballers from Zürich